Nehru: A Contemporary's Estimate is a 1966 book written by Walter Crocker and published by Oxford University Press. It is a biography of Jawaharlal Nehru. The book was originally published with a foreword by Arnold Toynbee. It has been reprinted in 2009 by Random House India with a new foreword by Ramachandra Guha.

Crocker
Crocker had served as the Australian High Commissioner to India between 1952 and 1955 and again from 1958 to 1962. This gave him a privileged opportunity to study Nehru, according to Arnold Toynbee, who declares in his foreword that this book will continue to be of interest to posterity because of Crocker's "first hand knowledge" which makes the book "priceless" and "irreplaceable". Historian Madhavan Palat, the series editor of Oxford University Press's Selected Works of Jawaharlal Nehru, notes that Crocker "was no blind admirer of the Prime Minister of the country he was accredited to. In fact, he rather admired some of Nehru’s democratic opponents more — like, for instance, C. Rajagopalachari and Jayaprakash Narayan. And yet he was drawn to Nehru’s intellect and to his politics sufficiently to go beyond the call of diplomatic duty to analyse Nehru’s impact on his times, with disinterested interest."

Crocker himself wrote in his introduction that "had my job in Delhi been anything else I would still have watched him, out of interest, almost helpless interest. He was interesting because of his political importance but still more interesting because of himself. Mostly I admired him; occasionally he was disappointing; but always he fascinated me".

View of Nehru
Ramachandra Guha, who calls the book "the best single-volume study" of Nehru, with "arguments and conclusions [that] speak directly to the present", wrote in 2006 that  in his opinion the following excerpts taken from Crocker's book provide for the best summing up of Nehru as an individual and as a leader:

Difference between 1966 and 2009 versions of the book
The 2009 reprint removed Toynbee's foreword and an introductory chapter on Indian society and history and added annotations to contextualize material for modern readers that would likely have been familiar to the original audience of Crocker's book.

References

Books
Nehru:A Contemporary's Estimate by Walter Crocker with a Foreword by Arnold Toynbee(1966).New York: Oxford University Press.
Nehru: A Contemporary's Estimate by Walter Crocker with a Foreword by Ramachandra Guha(2009). Random House India.

Indian biographies
Jawaharlal Nehru